Divyadarshan (born 26 October 1986) is an actor  and Producer from Kerala, India. Divyadarshan made his debut in Malayalam through the movie Hide n' Seek in 2012 and has acted in eight movies since then.

Personal life
Divyadarshan was born in Pattathanam Kollam, Kerala as the only son of actor E. A. Rajendran and Sandhya Rajendran. He is the grandson of theater artist and writer O. Madhavan and Vijayakumari, who is also an actress. He is also the nephew of actor Mukesh.

Career
The actor made his entry into the Malayalam cinema industry in a lead role through Anil's Hide n' Seek, which was also his home production. He also acted in the movies Mr. Bean, Teens and Kootathil Oral.
In 2014, Divyadarshan played the lead in Jahangir Shams's Karanavar.

The actor will be seen in Anil Radhakrishnan Menon's upcoming movie Lord Livingstone 7000 Kandi, a comical fantasy film.

Filmography

Television

References

1986 births
Living people
Male actors from Kollam
Male actors in Malayalam cinema
Indian male film actors
21st-century Indian male actors